W. maculata may refer to:

 Wertheimeria maculata, a catfish endemic to Brazil
 Woodworthia maculata, a New Zealand gecko